Harold Reynolds (born 12 October 1935) is a former British cyclist. He competed in the individual and team road race events at the 1956 Summer Olympics. He also rode in the 1960 Tour de France.

References

External links
 

1935 births
Living people
British male cyclists
Olympic cyclists of Great Britain
Cyclists at the 1956 Summer Olympics
Sportspeople from Birmingham, West Midlands